Larbi Ben Salah Abid (born June 30, 1953 in Korba) is a Tunisian politician, he was second vice-president of the Constituent assembly between 2011 and 2014.

Biography
He obtained his Bachelor of Arts in 1974 from Carthage Présidence Lyceum, a Masters in Private Law in 1981 and the Certificate of aptitude for the profession of Lawyer, before starting his professional career in the insurance sector, before joining the legal profession after five years. He was also a member of the National Bar Association in Tunisia from 2001 to 2004.

He has been a member of the Tunisian Human Rights League and the National Council for Liberties in Tunisia since their creation.

Personal life 
Laribi Ben Salah Abid is married and has three children.

References 

1953 births
Living people
People from Tunis
Vice presidents of Tunisia
People from Korba, Chhattisgarh